The Acre antshrike (Thamnophilus divisorius) is a member of the antbird family (Thamnophilidae). Its closest relatives are the streak-backed antshrike and the Amazonian antshrike.

It was discovered in 1996, in the Acre Arch uplands in the state of Acre in Brazil, and described as a species new to science in 2004.

It is found in low-growing woodland. Its known range lies within the remote Serra do Divisor National Park in Brazil and the adjacent Sierra del Divisor National Park in Peru, but it is believed to be common there. Because of its apparently stable population, the International Union for Conservation of Nature has listed it as a species of least concern despite its relatively restricted range.

References

Acre antshrike
Birds of the Brazilian Amazon
Birds of the Peruvian Amazon
Acre antshrike